Madison is a Canadian teen drama television series that premiered on Global Television Network on September 21, 1993. The first season of the series was released in 1992 and 1993 to classrooms as a learning aid under the title of Working It Out at Madison, before becoming a television series for entertainment purposes.

The series was eventually sold to broadcasters in 88 countries worldwide and was nominated for the Best Dramatic Series award at Canada's Gemini Awards in 1995, 1996 and 1997, respectively.

Cast
 Enuka Okuma as Sheri Davis (1994–1998; eps. 14-65)
 Michelle Beaudoin as Penny Foster (1994–1995; eps. 14-39)
 Will Sasso as Derek Wakaluk (1994–1998; eps. 14-65)
 Jonathan Scarfe as R.J. Winslow (1994–1995; eps. 14-39)
 Peter Stebbings as Kevin Sharpe (1994–1998; eps. 14-65)
 Stacy Grant as Tia Winslow (1994–1995; eps. 14-39) (1997; eps. 53-65)
 Chris William Martin as Jamie Novak (1994–1998; eps. 14-65)
 Sarah Strange as Carol Lemieux (1994–1998; eps. 14-65)
 Chad Willett as Tom Connor (1994–1995; eps. 14-39)
 Joely Collins as Rachael Langston (1994–1998; eps. 14-65)
 Barry Pepper as Mick
 Shaira Holman as Beth (1994–1996)

References

External links

 
 tvdb - Madison
1990s Canadian teen drama television series
1993 Canadian television series debuts
1998 Canadian television series endings
Global Television Network original programming
Television series about teenagers
Television shows filmed in Vancouver
Television shows set in Vancouver